Air Livonia was a small airline based at Pärnu Airport in Estonia providing scheduled and charter flights.

Code data 
ICAO Code: LIV
Callsign: LIVONIA

Services 
Air Livonia operated the following scheduled services (at February 2005):
Pärnu to Kihnu, Ruhnu and Kuressaare.

Fleet 

The Air Livonia fleet includes the following aircraft:
Antonov An-28
Antonov An-2

External links 

Defunct airlines of Estonia
Airlines established in 1999
Airlines disestablished in 2006
2006 disestablishments in Estonia
1999 establishments in Estonia